Case Closed: Sunflowers of Inferno, known as  in Japan, is a 2015 Japanese anime film directed by Kobun Shizuno and is the nineteenth installment of the film series based on the Case Closed anime and manga series. It was released on April 18, 2015.

Plot 
At an exclusive auction house in New York City, a painting recently found in Arles is up for bids. It had been examined by various experts and declared to be one of Vincent van Gogh's "Sunflowers", similar to a masterpiece thought to be destroyed during a U.S. air raid in Japan during World War II.

Jirokichi Suzuki, accompanied by his niece, Sonoko fights off all contenders with a $300 million bid. At a press conference, he announces his plan to gather all seven of the known Van Gogh's Sunflowers paintings around the world for a grand exhibition. The venue would be a purpose-built gallery in Japan known as "Lake Rock", which boasts of iron-clad security and protection of the art pieces against fire, damaging humidity, sunlight, etc. The announcement is broadcast live worldwide, watched by Conan and Haibara.

Jirokichi also announces the engagement of seven specialists, whom he called the "Seven Samurai", to oversee the exhibition and protect the Sunflowers:
 Keiko Anderson, a painting exhibition planning professional;
 Natsumi Miyadai, a painting history professional;
 Koji Azuma, a painting restoration and preservation professional;
 Kumiko Kishi, a painting exhibition professional;
 Taizo Ishimine, a painting transportation professional;
 Charlie, a New York Police Department professional engaged to safeguard the painting out of New York;
 Kogoro Mori, a Tokyo private detective engaged to protect the painting in Japan.

Suddenly, a card is thrown on the platform, which has the insignia of the legendary phantom thief, Kaitou Kid. Kid makes his presence known, causing mass panic by firing his card gun. Inspector Charlie chases Kaitou Kid and surrounds him, but Kid is still able to escape using a flare bomb. Much to Jirokichi and Sonoko's shock, Kudō Shinichi arrives from behind and offers his services to catch Kid.

Conan is particularly intrigued by Kid's sudden interest in masterpiece paintings, as his interests had previously been limited to gemstones. The painting is moved by airplane with the Seven Samurai, Jirokichi, Sonoko and Shinichi Kudō riding in it and set out for Japan. Ran, Conan and his friends, Kogoro, Inspector Nakamori, Agasa and others arrive at the Haneda airport to receive them. A bomb detonates near the cargo compartment of the plane and the recently purchased painting flies away. Shinichi jumps off the plane and saves the painting. It is revealed that Shinichi Kudo is none other than Kaitou Kid himself in disguise (surprise surprise didn't see that one coming). The police and Conan spot Kid flying away with the painting, while the plane is in danger of crashing. This triggers chaos at the airport. Conan locates Kid on the terrace but Kid merely smirks and leaves. Conan finds out that Kid left the painting on the roof of a building. The plane safely lands and there are no casualties. The painting is retrieved by Conan who was mystified by Kid's actions as Kid never did any actions that could potentially harm anyone, and suspects a "fake Kid". The painting is examined and is found to be unharmed.

Inspector Charlie brands Kid as a ruthless murderer and terrorist, to which Sonoko objects (as she, like many others is a fan of Kid). Meanwhile, a Kid card arrives, saying he would be stealing van Gogh's second painting. Conan happenes to be at the art gallery where the second painting is, and as he went off when he heard news about Kid, he put Haibara in charge of the other kids. Haibara then resumes a talk with an old woman who came to the art gallery every day to see van Gogh's painting.

As the Seven Samurai are securing the painting, another Kid card appears, hinting that the painting was already stolen ahead of time and was replaced with a replica. Conan is surprised as Kid never lied about the time of his thefts. Tricked by it, Jirokichi orders the painting to be reexamined. Natsumi is unable to determine if the painting is real or fake and asks to take the painting to their workshop. One of the security guards puts a Kid card in Jirokichi's pocket and is reveals himself as Kaitou Kid. Kid steals the painting and is chased by Conan and Charlie. But Kid once more outwits them and escapes. In the new note, Kid demands ¥10 billion in cash as a ransom for the second painting within the next two hours, and Jirokichi accepts. This again puzzles Conan, because Kid had never demanded money and had always returned stolen goods. The money, in cash, is placed in an isolated room with only the art gallery's director present. Conan finds that the pressure in the room was increasing, as the water in a bottle in the room seemed to have increased, even though the director had drunk from it. Conan and Charlie storm the room, and Kid who appears at that room escaped, though the painting is intact. Kid had also anonymously contacted the media to witness the escapade. Jirokichi announces that the seven paintings would remain exhibiting on schedule, though Jirokichi is threatened with another Kid's card and Phosphine. Inspector Charlie resolves to show no mercy against Kid, and intends to kill him.

On the day of the exhibition, Kid once more impersonates Shinichi, and attends the exhibition. He leaves another Kid card with an enigmatic message. Conan discovers it and realises that it is a cryptic warning related to the Last Supper and its betrayer. Conan understands that Kid is warning that one of the Seven Samurai is the culprit behind these incidents. As soon as Kid's presence is discovered, Jirokichi orders the gallery be evacuated and asks Inspector Nakamori to perform a background check on the Seven Samurai, while Charlie pursues Kid. Suddenly, the power system fails and a fire breaks out. Nakamori identifies that Koji Azuma had previously killed his twin brother when the newly discovered painting was recovered from Arles. Azuma confesses, but denies being the culprit in the present incident. In the fierce fire, two of the paintings are left to burn. Kid saves one of the paintings. Conan arrives to see Kid desperately trying to save the other painting whose security system has been jammed. Kid and Conan, with Ran's help, are able to activate the security mechanism and put the painting to safety while the gallery is collapsing.

In a desperate bid to put out the inferno, Kid detonates a bomb which breaks the water tank and douses the fire. Ran is knocked unconscious. Kid takes Ran and flees along with Conan. Kid tells Conan that he was aware of the culprit's plans to destroy the paintings when he hacked into her computer. Conan realises that Kid is innocent. The building threatens to collapse, so Conan requests Kid to save Ran and leave. Kid reluctantly agrees and breaks out of the building and leaves Ran near a lake. Jirokichi inspects the paintings and discovers that the second painting is missing.

Conan, using Shinichi's voice, then contacts everyone and concluded that Natsumi Miyadai is the true culprit. He reveals to everyone that all this while, Kaitou Kid was aware who the culprit was all along and was constantly thwarting her plans. In New York Kid had caused chaos so that Jirokichi would tighten the security of the paintings, preventing Natsumi to carry her plans. Kid had impersonated Shinichi and accompanied the group to Japan to ensure that the painting was safely transported. Natsumi had set off a bomb in the plane to destroy the painting, but Kid had rescued it and returned it. Knowing that Natsumi was also targeting the fifth painting, Kid had sent out a theft notice to once more tighten the security. Natsumi planted a fake Kid card to perform a re-examination of the painting. When Natsumi had suggested taking the painting to her workshop, Kid was forced to snatch it away, with the motive to enforce security. It was Natsumi who had sent the fake Kid card and phosphine to kill Jirokichi, to halt the exhibition and destroy the paintings. Natsumi had suggested putting fake sunflowers near her targets and had coated them with turpentine to act as incendiary. To stop Natsumi, Kid had sent out a message to Conan, hoping the latter would expose her. Natsumi wanted to destroy the two paintings as she was under the false assumption that they were fakes.

Kid and Ran are able to escape from the wreckage, but Conan is trapped inside as the water flooded the gallery. Ran is found by the police. Conan uses the ball to generate pressure differences to ensure the rock would explode, and goes along the water stream with the last painting. He falls unconscious for a brief moment before being able to resurface to be rescued by Kogoro.

Kid is cornered by Charlie. Kid tells Charlie that Natsumi had previously sent him an anonymous voice message, to steal the paintings for her. Being a master of disguise, Kid had identified her and was after her. Charlie asks Kid as to why the paintings concerned him. Kid tells him that during the first US air raid in Japan during World War II, the painting was saved from being burnt down by Azuma's grandfather, confirming that the painting was real. He requested a servant to save his lover from the fire. The servant had told Kid of this story and had asked him to save the paintings at all costs. The servant is revealed to be Konosuke Jii, Kaitou Kid's friend and assistant. The woman is revealed to be the old lady which Haibara talked to in the museum.

Charlie decides not to apprehend Kid, because despite being a thief, Kid is a man of honor. Kaitou Kid shows his respect to Charlie and mysteriously vanishes.

Cast

Production

Release 
The film was released in the Philippines on July 22, 2015, announced by SM Cinema on Facebook. It was released in Singapore on July 20, 2015, in Indonesia on August 5, 2015, and in the United States on January 19, 2021.

Discotek Media licensed the film for home video in North America. The Blu-ray will release on January 25, 2022.

Box office 
It was by far the highest grossing Case Closed film with most tickets sold by August 2015.

The film was number-four on its opening weekend in China, grossing . It earned  by its second weekend.

References

External links 
 

2015 films
2015 anime films
TMS Entertainment
Toho animated films
Sunflowers of Inferno
Discotek Media
Films directed by Kobun Shizuno
Films with screenplays by Takeharu Sakurai